Sexton Wood is a  biological Site of Special Scientific Interest north-west of Ditchingham in Norfolk. It is a Nature Conservation Review site, Grade 2. 

This ancient wood on boulder clay is mainly coppice with standards, but there are some areas of high forest. The ground flora is diverse, with dog's mercury dominant and other plants such as ransoms and early-purple orchid.

The wood is private property with no public access.

References

Sites of Special Scientific Interest in Norfolk
Nature Conservation Review sites